Malpeque Bay is a  estuarine bay on the north shore of Prince Edward Island, Canada.

Description
Malpeque Bay is the second largest bay in terms of surface area in Prince Edward Island, following Hillsborough Bay.  It is also notable for almost dividing the province; an isthmus occupied by the city of Summerside and the unincorporated communities of North St. Eleanors, Sherbrooke and Travellers Rest separates Malpeque Bay from Bedeque Bay on the island's south shore.

Islands
Malpeque Bay has several islands located along its northern border as well as entirely within the bay itself:

 Mary Fraser Island
 Courtin Island
 Little Courtin Island
 Little Rock
 Ram Island
 Bird Island
 Lennox Island
 Hog Island, a barrier island forming the northern boundary of Malpeque Bay
 Fish Island, a section of Hog Island that occasionally separates/joins due to erosion and accretion

Inlets
Malpeque Bay has several inlets:

 Hardys Channel, separating Hog Island and the Conway Sand Hills connects the northwestern part of Malpeque Bay to the open Gulf of St. Lawrence
 Conway Narrows, connects the northwestern part of Malpeque Bay to Cascumpec Bay
 Ship Channel / Malpeque Harbour, separating Hog Island/Fish Island from Royalty Point in Prince Royalty, connecting the northeastern part of Malpque Bay to the open Gulf of St. Lawrence

Communities
The city of Summerside is the largest population centre directly fronting the bay. The following communities are located along the bay's shoreline from west to east:

 East Bideford
 Lennox Island First Nation
 Port Hill
 Birch Hill
 Bayside
 Grand River
 Wellington Centre
 Southwest Lot 16
 Central Lot 16
 Belmont Lot 16
 North St. Eleanors
 Slemon Park
 Summerside
 Sherbrooke
 Travellers Rest
 New Annan
 Clermont
 Indian River
 Hamilton
 Baltic
 Malpeque
 Darnley

Ramsar site
Malpeque Bay was classified as a wetland of international importance via the Ramsar Convention on April 28, 1988. It consists of marine and coastal wetlands ranging in altitude from sea level to 8 m. It is protected from the Gulf of St. Lawrence by a sandspit and dune formation that stretches 25 km. Small rivers and creeks are the source of freshwater for the lagoon.

It is "important for supporting large nesting colonies" of herons and cormorants, and is a meaningful nursery area for fin and shell fishes. Malpeque oysters are prized by connoisseurs.

The bay supports several recreational areas, primarily at Cabot Beach Provincial Park and Green Park Provincial Park.

There is some concern regarding development of the area and its surroundings.  There has been extensive cottage development on the eastern and southern shores of the bay since the 1950s.  Prince Edward Island's largest industrial operation, two french fry processing plants operated by Cavendish Farms, discharge into the Barbara Weit River in the southeastern corner of the bay.  A petition was also organized in the early 2000s to stop a proposed wind energy project along the eastern shore of the bay which was submitted to Natural Resources Canada.  However, the development never took place. The recreational use of the area is a "threat to nesting and brood-rearing Piping plovers."

References

Bays of Prince Edward Island
Landforms of Prince County, Prince Edward Island
Ramsar sites in Canada